

Public General Acts

|-
| {{|Psychoactive Substances Act 2016|public|2|28-01-2016|maintained=y|An Act to make provision about psychoactive substances; and for connected purposes.}}
|-
| {{|Supply and Appropriation (Anticipation and Adjustments) Act 2016|public|3|16-03-2016|maintained=y|An Act to authorise the use of resources for the years ending with 31 March 2015, 31 March 2016 and 31 March 2017; to authorise the issue of sums out of the Consolidated Fund for those years; and to appropriate the supply authorised by this Act for the years ending with 31 March 2015 and 31 March 2016.}}
|-
| {{|Charities (Protection and Social Investment) Act 2016|public|4|16-03-2016|maintained=y|An Act to amend the Charities Act 1992 and the Charities Act 2011.}}
|-
| {{|Childcare Act 2016|public|5|16-03-2016|maintained=y|An Act to make provision about free childcare for young children of working parents and about the publication of information about childcare and related matters by local authorities in England.}}
|-
| {{|Education and Adoption Act 2016|public|6|16-03-2016|maintained=y|An Act to make provision about schools in England that are causing concern, including provision about their conversion into Academies and about intervention powers; and to make provision about joint arrangements for carrying out local authority adoption functions in England.}}
|-
| {{|Welfare Reform and Work Act 2016|public|7|16-03-2016|maintained=y|An Act to make provision about reports on progress towards full employment and the apprenticeships target; to make provision about reports on the effect of certain support for troubled families; to make provision about life chances; to make provision about the benefit cap; to make provision about social security and tax credits; to make provision for loans for mortgage interest and other liabilities; and to make provision about social housing rents.}}
|-
| {{|Riot Compensation Act 2016|public|8|23-03-2016|maintained=y|An Act to repeal the Riot (Damages) Act 1886 and make provision about types of claims, procedures, decision-making and limits on awards payable in relation to a new compensation scheme for property damaged, destroyed or stolen in the course of riots.}}
|-
| {{|Access to Medical Treatments (Innovation) Act 2016|public|9|23-03-2016|maintained=y|An Act to make provision for access to innovative medical treatments; and for connected purposes.}}
|-
| {{|NHS (Charitable Trusts Etc) Act 2016|public|10|23-03-2016|maintained=y|An Act to make provision for, and in connection with, the removal of the Secretary of State's powers under the National Health Service Act 2006 to appoint trustees; to make provision transferring to Great Ormond Street Hospital Children's Charity the right to a royalty conferred by Schedule 6 to the Copyright, Designs and Patents Act 1988; and for connected purposes.}}
|-
| {{|Scotland Act 2016|public|11|23-03-2016|maintained=y|An Act to amend the Scotland Act 1998 and make provision about the functions of the Scottish Ministers; and for connected purposes.}}
|-
| {{|Enterprise Act 2016|public|12|04-05-2016|maintained=y|An Act to make provision relating to the promotion of enterprise and economic growth; provision about Sunday working; and provision restricting exit payments in relation to public sector employment.}}
|-
| {{|Northern Ireland (Stormont Agreement and Implementation Plan) Act 2016|public|13|04-05-2016|maintained=y|An Act to make provision about the Independent Reporting Commission, extend the period for the appointment of Northern Ireland Ministers, modify the pledge made by Northern Ireland Ministers on taking office, provide for persons becoming Members of the Northern Ireland Assembly to give an undertaking, and make provision about the draft budget of the Northern Ireland Executive, in pursuance of the agreement made on 17 November 2015 called A Fresh Start: The Stormont Agreement and Implementation Plan.}}
|-
| {{|Bank of England and Financial Services Act 2016|public|14|04-05-2016|maintained=y|An Act to make provision about the Bank of England; to make provision about the regulation of financial services; to make provision about the issue of banknotes; and for connected purposes.}}
|-
| {{|Trade Union Act 2016|public|15|04-05-2016|maintained=y|An Act to make provision about industrial action, trade unions, employers' associations and the functions of the Certification Officer.}}
|-
| {{|Driving Instructors (Registration) Act 2016|public|16|12-05-2016|maintained=y|An Act to make provision about the registration of driving instructors.}}
|-
| {{|Criminal Cases Review Commission (Information) Act 2016|public|17|12-05-2016|maintained=y|An Act to extend the Criminal Cases Review Commission's powers to obtain information.}}
|-
| {{|House of Commons Members' Fund Act 2016|public|18|12-05-2016|maintained=y|An Act to consolidate and amend provisions about the House of Commons Members' Fund.}}
|-
| {{|Immigration Act 2016|public|19|12-05-2016|maintained=y|An Act to make provision about the law on immigration and asylum; to make provision about access to services, facilities, licences and work by reference to immigration status; to make provision about the enforcement of certain legislation relating to the labour market; to make provision about language requirements for public sector workers; to make provision about fees for passports and civil registration; and for connected purposes.}}
|-
| {{|Energy Act 2016|public|20|12-05-2016|maintained=y|An Act to make provision about the Oil and Gas Authority and its functions; to make provision about rights to use upstream petroleum infrastructure; to make provision about the abandonment of offshore installations, submarine pipelines and upstream petroleum infrastructure; to extend Part 1A of the Petroleum Act 1998 to Northern Ireland; to make provision about the disclosure of information for the purposes of international agreements; to make provision about fees in respect of activities relating to oil, gas, carbon dioxide and pipelines; to make provision about wind power; and for connected purposes.}}
|-
| {{|Armed Forces Act 2016|public|21|12-05-2016|maintained=y|An Act to continue the Armed Forces Act 2006; to make provision about service discipline; to make provision about war pensions committees established under section 25 of the Social Security Act 1989; to make provision about Ministry of Defence fire-fighters; and for connected purposes.}}
|-
| {{|Housing and Planning Act 2016|public|22|12-05-2016|maintained=y|An Act to make provision about housing, estate agents, rentcharges, planning and compulsory purchase.}}
|-
| {{|Supply and Appropriation (Main Estimates) Act 2016|public|23|20-07-2016|maintained=y|An Act to authorise the use of resources for the year ending with 31 March 2017; to authorise both the issue of sums out of the Consolidated Fund and the application of income for that year; and to appropriate the supply authorised for that year by this Act and by the Supply and Appropriation (Anticipation and Adjustments) Act 2016.}}
|-
| {{|Finance Act 2016|public|24|15-09-2016|maintained=y|An Act to grant certain duties, to alter other duties, and to amend the law relating to the National Debt and the Public Revenue, and to make further provision in connection with finance.}}
|-
| {{|Investigatory Powers Act 2016|public|25|29-11-2016|maintained=y|An Act to make provision about the interception of communications, equipment interference and the acquisition and retention of communications data, bulk personal datasets and other information; to make provision about the treatment of material held as a result of such interception, equipment interference or acquisition or retention; to establish the Investigatory Powers Commissioner and other Judicial Commissioners and make provision about them and other oversight arrangements; to make further provision about investigatory powers and national security; to amend sections 3 and 5 of the Intelligence Services Act 1994; and for connected purposes.}}
}}

Local Acts

|-
| {{|Haberdashers' Aske's Charity Act 2016|local|2|15-09-2016|maintained=y|archived=n|An Act to make provision regarding the identity of the corporators of the Aske Corporation and the status of the Corporation; to provide for property held on trust by the Corporation to be subject to the same legal controls as apply generally to charity property; to make formal provision for internal procedures; and for related purposes.}}
}}

See also
 List of Acts of the Parliament of the United Kingdom

References
Current Law Statutes Annotated 2016

2016